This is a list of solved missing person cases of people who went missing in unknown locations or unknown circumstances that were eventually explained by their reappearance or the recovery of their bodies, or the conviction of the perpetrator(s) responsible for their disappearances.

Before 1900

1900–1929

1930–1949

1950–1969

1970s

1980s

1990s

See also

 List of kidnappings
 List of murder convictions without a body
 List of people who disappeared mysteriously: pre-1910
 List of people who disappeared mysteriously: 1910–1990
 List of people who disappeared mysteriously: 1990–present
 List of unsolved deaths
 Lists of unsolved murders
 List of solved missing person cases: post-2000

Notes

References

Bibliography
 
 
 
 
 
 
 
 
 
 
 
 
 
 

solved missing person cases
Missing people